The 1922 PGA Championship was the fifth PGA Championship, held August 14–18 at Oakmont Country Club in Oakmont, Pennsylvania, a suburb northeast of Pittsburgh. The match play field of 64 competitors qualified by sectional tournaments. This was the first PGA Championship with a field of 64 in the bracket; the previous four had fields of 32 players. In the Friday final, Gene Sarazen defeated Emmet French, 4 & 3.

Sarazen, age 20, also won the U.S. Open a month earlier near Chicago. Defending champion Walter Hagen did not enter this year due to exhibition engagements; the two champions met the following year in the finals, won by Sarazen.

This was the first of twelve major championships at Oakmont; three PGA Championships and nine U.S. Opens through 2016. It has hosted the U.S. Amateur five times and the U.S. Women's Open twice. The PGA Championship returned in 1951 and 1978.

Sarazen was the first of four players in history to win the U.S. Open and the PGA Championship in the same calendar year. He was followed by Ben Hogan in 1948 and Jack Nicklaus in 1980. Through 2012, Tiger Woods is the last to win both, in 2000, part of his Tiger Slam of four consecutive majors.

Course layout

Source:

Format
The match play format at the PGA Championship in 1922 called for 10 rounds (180 holes) in five days. The first two rounds were 18-hole matches, contested in the morning and afternoon of the first day, which reduced the field to sixteen players. The third round, quarterfinals, semifinals, and finals were 36-hole matches played on the final four days, Tuesday through Friday.

 Monday - first two rounds, 18 holes each
 Tuesday - third round, 36 holes each
 Wednesday - quarterfinals - 36 holes
 Thursday - semifinals - 36 holes
 Friday - final - 36 holes

Bracket 1

Bracket 2

Bracket 3

Bracket 4

Final four

References

External links
PGA Media Guide 2012
Results at golfobserver.com 
PGA.com – 1922 PGA Championship

PGA Championship
Golf in Pennsylvania
PGA Championship
PGA Championship
PGA Championship
PGA Championship